This is a list of county courthouses in the U.S. state of Minnesota.  Each county in Minnesota has a city that is the county seat where the county government resides, including a county courthouse.

Federal courthouses in Minnesota are listed here.

See also
 List of courthouses in the United States
 List of United States federal courthouses in Minnesota

References

 
Courthouses, county
Minnesota